The 2019 SailGP Championship was the first season of the SailGP championship, and was won by the Australian team.

Entries 

The series had six teams enter, all of which competed in all rounds.

Calendar 
The season was contested over five rounds, of which all but one were won by the Australian team.

Season

Round 1: Sydney

Round 2: San Francisco

Round 3: New York

Round 4: Cowes

Round 5: Marseilles

Results 
Points were awarded per race, with 10 points for the winner, 9 points for second place, 8 points for third, and so on.

Each event hosted multiple races, with the two highest scoring teams after each round facing off one-on-one. The winner of that final race won the event. The two highest scoring teams at the end of the season competed in Marseille with the winning team awarded the championship.

Notes

References

External links 
 SailGP website

Season 1
2019 in sailing